Cathegesis is a genus of moths in the family Gelechiidae.

Species
Cathegesis angulifera (Walsingham, 1897)
Cathegesis psoricopterella (Walsingham, [1892])
Cathegesis vinitincta Walsingham, 1910

References

Dichomeridinae